Ekmanfjorden is an  long fjord branching north from inner Isfjorden. It is separated by Nordfjorden to the south by Sveaneset in the west and Kapp Wærn in the east. It lies within Nordre Isfjorden National Park.

The fjord is named after the Swedish businessman, and patron of the arts and sciences, Johan Oscar Ekman (1812–1907).

References

 Norwegian Polar Institute Place Names of Svalbard Database

Fjords of Spitsbergen